is a Japanese voice actress affiliated with Amuleto. She was previously affiliated with Production Ace.

Filmography

Anime

Original video animation (OVA)
Nichijou Episode 0 (Yūko Aioi)

Video games
Glass Heart Princess (Satsuki Chiga)
Glass Heart Princess:PLATINUM (Satsuki Chiga)
Chaos;Child (Momone Takayanagi)
Steins;Gate 0 (Katsumi Nakase)
Megadimension Neptunia VII (Uzume Tennouboshi/天王星うずめ)
Genkai Tokki: Seven Pirates (Rindo)
Girls' Frontline (AA-12)
No Straight Roads (Eve)
Granblue Fantasy (Former Divine Boar)
Cyberdimension Neptunia: 4 Goddesses Online (Uzume Tennouboshi)
DC Super Hero Girls: Teen Power (Lois Lane)
Arknights (Kazemaru)
Genshin Impact (Sandrone)
Anonymous;Code (Iroha Kyogoku)

Dubbing
Teenage Mutant Ninja Turtles: Out of the Shadows (Alessandra Ambrosio)

References

Further reading
Newtype October 2009
Newtype April 2010
Shuukan Ascii Akihabara Genteiban May 2011

External links
Official blog 
Official agency profile 

Living people
Japanese video game actresses
Japanese voice actresses
Voice actresses from Kanagawa Prefecture
Year of birth missing (living people)
21st-century Japanese actresses